Diyabath is a cold soup, traditionally consumed by the indigenous people of Sri Lanka as a breakfast item. It is made from rice left overnight to ferment and then mixed with coconut milk, onion, garlic and raw chili. It is not consumed regularly due to changing lifestyle.

With a low glycaemic index and an anti-inflammatory effect, it also provides a probiotic effect similar to that of curd. It gives a feeling of satiety even with a small portion, while having a soothing effect on gastric ulcers.

This dish is called "Palan Kanji" (Old Porridge) in southern India. It is prepared a little differently from in Sri Lanka. Most Indian people do not add coconut milk since coconut is more expensive in India. Mostly, they burn a piece of dried fish using fire (from a firewood stove) to have this rice.

See also
Dal bhat
Okroshka
Cuisine of Sri Lanka

External links
 Report Fourth International Conference on Fermented Foods, Health Status and Social Well-being
 Newsletter SASNET Fermented Foods
 Let justice be meted out to Rohana Wijeweera (Search for "Diya bath")

Sri Lankan rice dishes
Cold soups
Rice dishes
Sri Lankan porridges